Keep It Real may refer to:

 "Keep It Real" (Jamal song)
 "Keep It Real" (MC Ren song)
 "Keep It Real" (Miilkbone song)
 "Keep It Real", a song by B.G. & the Chopper City Boyz from Life in the Concrete Jungle
 "Keep It Real", a song by the Jonas Brothers from Lines, Vines and Trying Times
 Keep It Real: Everything You Need to Know About Researching and Writing Creative Nonfiction, a book edited by Lee Gutkind

See also 
 Keepin' It Real (disambiguation)